Tipuani Municipality is the sixth municipal section of the Larecaja Province in the  La Paz Department, Bolivia. Its seat is Tipuani.

Languages 
The languages spoken in the Tipuani Municipality are mainly Spanish, Aymara and Quechua.  

Ref.: obd.descentralizacion.gov.bo

References 
 www.ine.gob.bo / census 2001: Tipuani Municipality

External links 
 Old map of Larecaja Province (showing its previous political division)

Municipalities of La Paz Department (Bolivia)